Canadian plays have been written since the 19th century, both in English and in French. The present list comprises plays in English, some of which being translations from French Canadian plays. Full length and one act plays are included but not musicals.

The Playwrights Guild of Canada has a large list of titles of copyrighted plays, included in the present one, mostly their own publications or those of Playwrights Canada Press. The year of the playbook in the present list corresponds to the printed form, but when this information is unavailable, it corresponds to the first stage production. In rare cases, neither is available.

In addition to traditional forms, Canada has a vibrant non-traditional theatre scene with notable experimental, fringe, and other alternative forms, the largest fringe festival in North America being the Edmonton International Fringe Festival.

G

Gabe by Carol Bolt
The Gadget by Rex Deverell
Galileo Galilei by Robert Lalonde
Gameshow by Michael E Rose
The Garage Sale by David King
Gargoyle by Robin Fulford
Garrison's Garage: Encounters with Revenue Canada by Ted Johns
The Gay Heritage Project by Damien Atkins, Andrew Kushnir and Paul Dunn
Genesis: The Mary Shelley Play by Mary Humphrey Baldridge
Gently Down the Stream by Aviva Ravel
Genuine Fakes by John Lazarus
Geometry by Rachel Wyatt
Fables by Jackie Torrens
Gideon's Blues by George Boyd
Generations by Sharon Pollock.
Geography Match by James Reaney
The Gift by Anne Chislett
The Giant's Garden by Scott White
A Gingerbread House by Janice Wiseman
The Ginkgo Tree by Lee MacDougall
The Girl in the Flower Basket by Shirley Barrie
Girl in the Goldfish Bowl by Morris Panych
The Girl on the Mountain by Dorothy Lees-Blakey
The Girl Who Loved Her Horses by Drew Hayden Taylor
The Girls in the Gang by Raymond Storey
The Glace Bay Miners' Museum by Wendy Lill (adapted from the novel by Sheldon Currie)
Glengarry School Days by Anne Chislett
Glass Castles by Lindsay Price
Glenn by David S. Young
The Glassblower's Children by Michael Shepherd
Global Village by Rick McNair
Gloria Star by Michel Tremblay
The Glorious 12th by Raymond Storey
God and the Indian by Drew Hayden Taylor
Going Down for the Count by Peter Elliot Weiss
Going Down the River Going Down the River by Kevin Longfield
Gold Mountain Guest by Simon Johnston
The Golden Cod by Jeff Pitcher
The Golden Goose by Gwen Pharis Ringwood
The Golem of Praque by Gabriel Emanuel
Gone To Glory by Suzanne Finlay
Goodbye by Aviva Ravel
Good-bye and Keep Cold by Donn Short
Goodbye Cruel World by Warren Graves
Goodbye Marianne by Irene N. Watts
Goodbye, Piccadilly by Douglas Bowie
The Good Egg by Michael MacLennan
Good Mother by Damien Atkins
Good Neighbours by Irene N. Watts
Goodness by Michael Redhill
Goodnight Desdemona (Good Morning Juliet) by Ann-Marie MacDonald
Goodnight Disgrace by Michael Mercer
The Goodnight Bird by Colleen Murphy
Goose Spit by Viviene Laxdal
Gordon by Morris Panych
Goya by Henry Beissel
Grace by Michael MacLennan
Grace Under Pressure by Betty Jane Wylie
Granma's Stockings by Laurent Goulet
Grand Tirade at the Town Hall by Henry Beissel
Gravediggers of 1942 by Tom Hendry
Gravel Run by Conni Massing
The Gray Zone by Benj Gallander and Jaromir Novak
Great Expectations by Michael Shamata
The Great School Crisis: The Tory Revolution in Ontario's Schools by Ted Johns
The Great Wave of Civilization by Herschel Hardin
The Great Zanderthon Takeover
Green Dating by Chantal Bilodeau
Greenpieces by Mark Leiren-Young
The Groanin' Board by John Gounod Campbell
Grounded by John Spurway
Ground Zero by Brian Shein
La Guerre, Yes, Sir! by Roch Carrier
A Guide to Mourning by Eugene Stickland
Gulag by Robin Fulford
The Gull by Daphne Marlatt

H

Habitat by Judith Thompson
The Half of It by John Krizanc
Halo by Josh Macdonald
Hamish by Michael Grant
Hamlet - Who Cares? by Rick McNair
Hammer and Tongs by Jane Gilchrist
Hana's Suitcase on Stage by Emil Sher
The Hand That Cradles The Rock by Warren Graves
Hands by C. E. Gatchalian
Hands of Healing: The Story of Dr. Locke by Ted Johns
Happiness Hunting by Bo Anderson
Happily Ever After by Elliott Hayes
Happy: A Very Gay Little Musical by Sky Gilbert
Happy Holly by Beth McMaster
Happy Place by Pamela Mala Sinha
Harbour House by David King
Hard Hearts by Elliott Hayes
Harlem Duet by Djanet Sears
The Harps of God by Kent Stetson
Harvest by Ken Cameron
The Harrowing by Scott Douglas
Harry Oddstack and the Case of the Missing King by Rex Deverell
Hashisch by Gordon Armstrong
The Haunted Castle by Beth McMaster
The Head, Guts and Soundbone Dance by Michael Cook
The Heart Specialist by John Gounod Campbell
Heart to Heart by Barbara Novak
Hearts and Soles by Jaan Kolk
Heaven by George F. Walker
Heaven's Gates, Hell's Flames by a group of authors
Hedda Gabler by Judith Thompson
Hedges by Dave Carley
Heidi by Dorothy Lees-Blakey
Hellfire Pass by Vittorio Rossi
Henry III of Franceby Robert Lalonde
Heracles by Dennis Foon
Here Lies Henry by Daniel MacIvor
Here on the Flight Path by Norm Foster
The Hero by Rose Scollard
Heroine by Karen Bassett
her only customer... by Celia McBride
Hester: An Introduction by Sky Gilbert
He Won't Come In from the Barn: An Agricultural Comedy by Ted Johns
Hideous Hideous by Emil Sher
High-Gravel-Blind by Paul Dunn
High Life by Lee MacDougall
Hitching a Ride by Celia McBride
Hoarse Muse by Paddy Campbell
The Hobbit by Kim Selody
Hockey Dad: A Play in 3 Periods by Stephen Waldschmidt and James Popoff
Hooking for Paradise by Sharon Stearns
Holy Mo and Spew Boy by Lucia Frangione
Homage by Daniel R. Lillford
Homechild by Joan MacLeod
Home for the Funeral by Rachel Wyatt
Home Free by Seymour Blicker
Home is my Road by Florence Gibson MacDonald
Homesick by Conni Massing
Homeward Bound by Elliott Hayes
Homework & Curtains by John Lazarus
Honky Tonk Angels by Paul Ledoux
The Honourable Member by Jeff Pitcher
Hope and Caritas by Ian Weir
The Hope Slide by Joan MacLeod
Horns by Aviva Ravel
The Horsburgh Scandal: The Play by Betty Jane Wylie
Horseplay by Peter Anderson and Phil Savath
Hosanna by Michel Tremblay
Hot Flashes by Paul Ledoux
The Hours That Remain by Keith Barker
House by Daniel MacIvor
House of Glass by Clem Martini
House of Weasels by Kico Gonzalez-Risso
The House That Jack Built by Margaret Hollingsworth
How Are Things With the Walking Wounded? by Tom Hendry
How Could You, Mrs. Dick? by Douglas Rodger
How to Speak Male by Betty Jane Wylie
The Hum by Robert Tsonos
Hunger by Hope McIntyre
Hunter of Peace by Sharon Stearns
Hunting Stuart by Robertson Davies
Hurrah for Willoughby D! by Janice Wiseman

I

I Am Marguerite by Shirley Barrie
I Am Yours (play) by Judith Thompson
I Can't Feel the Rain by Tom Slater
Ice: Beyond Cool by John Lazarus
I, Claudia by Kristen Thomson
I Fell in Love with an Eel by Vern Thiessen
I Have Seen Beautiful Jim Key by Janet Munsil
I Love You, Baby Blue by Paul Thompson
I Met a Bully on the Hill by Maureen Hunter
Icetime by Carol Bolt
The Idler by Ian Weir
If Betty Should Rise by David Demchuk
If I'd Been There... by Daniel Libman
If We are Women by Joanna McClelland Glass
If We Were Birds by Erin Shields
If You Really Love Me... by Mark Leiren-Young
Illegal Entry by Clem Martini
The Illegal Playwriting Class by John Lazarus
Improvisations for Mr. X by Henry Beissel
Impromptu on Nun's Island by Michel Tremblay
The Impromptu of Outremont by Michel Tremblay
I'm Still Here by Ramona Baillie
In Absentia by Morris Panych
In a World Created by a Drunken God by Drew Hayden Taylor
In Confidence by Margaret Hollingsworth
Indian Heart by Ed Schroeter
Indian Heart by Ed Schroeter
In Dreams by Alan Williams
Inexpressible Island by David Young
Influence by Janet Munsil
Ingenious Speculations by Kim Selody
The Inner City Dead by Angus Kohm
In on It by Daniel MacIvor
Interface by Stephen Near
In the Eyes of God by Raul Sanchez Inglis
Ingenious Speculations by Jan Derbyshire
In the Lobster Capital of the World by Don Hannah
In the Midst of Death by Shirley Barrie
Intimate Betrayal by Tom Slater
Inside the Sand Castle by David Belke
The Inmates by Dan Daniels
Innocence Lost: A play about Steven Truscott by Beverley Cooper
Insomnia by Guillermo Verdecchia
Inspector Sly's Second-to-Last Case by Kico Gonzalez-Risso
Intimate Admiration by Richard Epp
Into by Dave Carley
Inuk by Henry Beissel
Inuk and the Sun by Henry Beissel
The Investigation Into The Strange Case Of The Wildboy by Sky Gilbert
In Which Pier Paolo Pasolini Sees His Own Death in the Face of a Boy: A Defacement in the Form of a Play by Sky Gilbert
In Piazza San Domenico by Steve Galluccio
In the Eyes of Stone Dogs by Daniel Danis
The Investigator by Reuben Ship
Invisible Kids by Dennis Foon
The Irish Connection by Jeff Pitcher
Is it true what they're sayin' 'bout you? by Daniel R. Lillford
The Island of Bliss by Ian Weir
The Island of Demons by George Woodcock
Islands by Margaret Hollingsworth
It Is Solved By Walking by Catherine Banks
It's Only Hot for Two Months in Kapuskasing by Margaret Hollingsworth

J

Jacob's Wake by Michael Cook
Jack Sheppard's Back by Shirley Barrie
Jake's Place: The Politics of a Marginal Man by Ted Johns
Jason by Betty Jane Wylie
Jasper Station by Norm Foster
The Jealous Cellist by Kico Gonzalez-Risso
Jehanne of the Witches by Sally Clark
Jelly Belly Makes Garbage Delight of Alligator Pie by Kim Selody
Je Me Souviens by Lorena Gale
Jennie's Story by Betty Lambert
Jenny's House of Joy by Norm Foster
Jephthah's Daughter by Charles Heavysege
Jessie's Landing by John Spurway
Jessica by Linda Griffiths
Jewel by Joan MacLeod
Jigsaw by Carol Libman
The Jigsaw Puzzle by Ann Snead
Jim by Mark Leiren-Young
Jim Dandy by Sky Gilbert
Jitters by David French
Job's Wife by Yvette Nolan
Joe Beef by David Fennario
Joey Shine by David King
Johannes Kepler by Robert Lalonde
Johannes Reuchlin and the Talmud by Basya Hunter
John Doe/Jack Rabbit by Neil Fleming
Johnny Mangano and His Astonishing Dogs by Michel Tremblay
Joint Bequest by Marilyn Boyle
Joke You by Jan Derbyshire
Journeys by Maxim Mazumdar
Juba by Stephen Burge Johnson
Jumping Mouse by Marion de Vries
A Jungle out There by Michael Riordon
Jupiter in July by Norm Foster
Just Another Day Just Another Day  by Angus Kohm.
Just a Minute by Irene N. Watts

K

Kafka by Brian Shein
Karla and Grif by Viviene Laxdal
Kayak by Jordan Hall
Keeper of the Light by Jeff Pitcher
Kidvid by Anna Fuerstenberg
A Killing Snow by Paul Ciufo
Kill Me Now by Brad Fraser
Kill Them by Paul Ledoux
Kim's Convenience by Ins Choi
The King of Ireland's Son by Paula Wing
The King of the Beavers by Sam Scribble
King of the Castle by Tom Slater
King of Thieves by George F. Walker
Kingsayer by Betty Jane Wylie
Kiss the Moon, Kiss the Sun by Norm Foster
The Kite by W.O. Mitchell
Knock, Knock by Rachel Wyatt
The Known Soldier by Jeff Pitcher
The Komagata Maru Incident by Sharon Pollock.
Kreskinned by Michael Healey and Kate Lynch
Kristallnacht by Richard Epp

L

Labour Unions, The Brotherhood of Mothers by Jan Derbyshire
The Lady Smith by Andrew Moodie
La Petite Injustice by Aviva Ravel
Larger than Life: The Musical by SG Lee
The Last Bus by Raymond Storey
The Last Days of Paul Bunyan by Dennis Foon
The Last Drop by Kim Selody
The Last Liberal by Dave Carley
The Last Real Summer by Warren Graves
Last Rites by Leslie Hamson
The Last Resort by Norm Foster
The Last Romantics by Michael MacLennan
Last Stop For Miles by Celia McBride
The Last Supper by Hillar Liitoja
The Late Blumer by John Lazarus
Late Company by Jordan Tannahill
Laund-O-Mat at the End of the World by Peter Gruner
Laura Secord by Sarah Anne Curzon
Law of the Land by Peter Anderson
Lawrence & Holloman by Morris Panych
Leaning over Railings by Michael MacLennan
Learning to Live with Personal Growth by Arthur Milner
Leave It The Way You Found It by Tom MacGregor
Leave of Absence by Lucia Frangione
Leaving Home by David French
A Legal Puzzle by W.A. Tremayne
Legends of King Solomon by Aviva Ravel
The Leisure Society by François Archambault
Leo by Rosa Labordé
Lesser Demons by Dorothy Dittrich
Let's Hear it for Christmas by Beth McMaster
Let's Make a World by Len Peterson
Letters to My Grandma by Anusree Roy
Liar by Brian Drader
Liars by Dennis Foon
Lies my Father Told me by Ted Allan
Life After God: The Play by Michael MacLennan
Life and A Lover by Natalie D. Meisner
Life as a Fly by Margaret Matulic
Life Coach by David King
History of the African Elephant by Clem Martini
A Life in the Movies by Rick McNair
Life on Mars by Elliott Hayes
Life Science by Morris Panych
Life without Instruction by Sally Clark
Lig & Bittle by Elyne Quan
The Lights of North America by David King
Lilies by Michel Marc Bouchard
Lillie by Irene N. Watts
Lilly, Alta. by Kenneth Dyba
A Line in the Sand by Guillermo Verdecchia and Marcus Youssef
Listen to the Wind by James Reaney
A Little Bird Told Me by Nelles Van Loon
Little blood brother by Vittorio Rossi
A Little Happiness by Ramona Baillie
Little Red Riding Hood by Nelles Van Loon
Little Sister by Joan MacLeod
A Little Something to Ease the Pain by Rene Aloma
Lion in the Streets by Judith Thompson
Listen to the Drum by Irene N. Watts
Little Sister by Joan MacLeod
Live! Nude! Animal! by Jackie Torrens
Live on Stage Uncensored by Tom Slater
Lodge by Gwen Pharis Ringwood
Lois After Death by Rachel Wyatt
Lokkinen by Barbara Sapergia
Lola Starr Builds Her Dream Home by Sky Gilbert
The Long Weekend by Norm Foster
Loon Boy by Kathleen McDonnell
Louis and Dave by Norm Foster
Lost and Found by Dan Daniels
Lost Souls and Missing Persons by Sally Clark
Love and Anger by George F. Walker
Love and Deception by Timothy Findley
Love and Ruins by Rachel Wyatt
Love and War Western Style by Rose Scollard
Love is Strange by Paul Ledoux
Love List by Norm Foster
Lovers and Liars by Kim Selody
Lovesong by Robin Fulford
Looooove (formerly Amooooor) by Pierre Bokor
Lucy by Damien Atkins
Lucky Strike by Hrant Alianak
Lust's Dominion by Robert Lalonde
Lysistrata by Peter Anderson

M

MacGregor's Hard Ice Cream and Gas by Daniel Macdonald
Madame Chairman by Warren Graves
Mad Boy Chronicle by Michael O'Brien
Madeleine by Laurent Goulet
Madonna of the Wilderness by Katherine Koller
Madwitch by Paddy Campbell
The Magic Transistor: A Purim Play by Aviva Ravel
Maggie's Getting Married by Norm Foster
Maggie and Pierre by Linda Griffiths
Maggie's Last Dance by Marty Chan
The Magic Sieve by Irene N. Watts
Magpie by Katherine Koller
Maharani and the Maple Leaf by Jan Derbyshire
Mahmoud by Tara Grammy and Tom Arthur Davis
La Maison Suspendue by Michel Tremblay
Makeover by Evan Tsitsias
The Malaysia Hotel by Laurie Fyffe
The Maltese Bodkin by David Belke
Mambo Italiano by Steve Galluccio
A Man with a View by Angus Kohm
Mandarin Oranges II by Rex Deverell
The Man from the Capital by Colin Heath
Man 2 Man by Kwame Stephens
The Man Who Collected Women by Rose Scollard
The Man Who Shot Chance Delaney by Ian Weir
The Man who Went by W.A. Tremayne
Many Happy Returns by Michael Shepherd
Maple Lodge by Colleen Curran
Marcel Pursued by the Hounds by Michel Tremblay
A Marginal Man by Yvette Nolan
Marguerite de Roberval by Shirley Barrie
Marina, le dernier rose aux joues by Michèle Magny
Marion Bridge by Daniel MacIvor
Mark by Betty Jane Wylie
The Marriage of Rodeo by Mark Melymick
Martha's Magic by Irene N. Watts
Martin Yesterday by Brad Fraser
Martina and the Apostles by Ed Schroeter
Master Plann by Kico Gonzalez-Risso
Mathematics by Hrant Alianak
Mattachine by David Demchuk
Les Maudits Anglais by Gary Geddes
McCarthy and the Old Woman by Rita Shelton Deverell
McClure by Munroe Scott
Mechanicsville Monologues by Don Laflamme
Medea's Disgust by John Lazarus
Medicare by Rex Deverell
A Medieval Hun by John Louis Carleton
Mella Mella by Gail Nyoka
The Melville Boys by Norm Foster
Melody Meets the Bag Lady by Rex Deverell
Memorial by Paul Dunn
Memories by Aviva Ravel
Memories of You by Wendy Lill
Mendel Fish by Aviva Ravel
Merch the Invisible Wizard by Linda Hutsell-Manning
The Merchants of Dazu by James DeFelice
Merlin by Paul Ledoux
Merlin and Arthur by Rick McNair
Merrily, Merrily by Jack Sheriff
The Merry Adventures of Robin Hood by Jeff Pitcher
Metamorphosis by Talia Pura
Metastasis: Chain of Ruin by Gordon Pengilly
Mick Unplugged by Greg Nelson
Midashasassesears by John Gounod Campbell
Midlife by Eugene Stickland
Midnight Madness by Dave Carley
Midnight Sun by Maja Ardal
The Mighty Carlins by Collin Doyle
The Mill by Hannah Moscovitch, Tara Beagan, Damien Atkins, and Matthew MacFadzean
The Miller's Daughter by Chantal Bilodeau adapted from the Brothers Grimm "The Girl without Hands"
Mindlands by W. A. Hamilton
Minnie Trail by W.P. Wood
The Minor Keys by David Belke
Mirage by Gwen Pharis Ringwood
Miriam's Well by Aviva Ravel
Mirror Game by Dennis Foon
Miss Chatelaine by Damien Atkins
Miss 'n Me by Catherine Banks
Missionary Position by Tom Hendry
Molly Wood by John Wimbs and Christopher Richards
Mom, Dad, I'm Living with a White Girl by Marty Chan
The Mona Lisa Toodle-oo by Gordon Armstrong
Monica Drew is a Kangaroo by Janice Wiseman
Monkeyshines by Suzanne Finlay
Moon People by Aviva Ravel
Monsieur Moliere's French Scenes by Don Druick
Monster by Daniel MacIvor
The Monument by Colleen Wagner
Moo by Sally Clark
The Moonlight Sonata of Beethoven Blatz by Armin Wiebe
The Moonshiners by Laurent Goulet
Mordred by William Wilfred Campbell
More Divine: A Performance for Roland Barthes by Sky Gilbert
More Munsch! by Kim McCaw
Morning by William Wilfred Campbell
The Morning Bird by Colleen Wagner
Mother Dear, You're Not Thinking Too Clear by Laurent Goulet
Mother Country by Margaret Hollingsworth
The Motherline by Chantal Bilodeau
Mother Tongue by Betty Quan
Mother Variations by Aviva Ravel
Motifs & Repetitions by C. E. Gatchalian
The Motor Trade by Norm Foster
Mountain Rose by Alan R. Davis
Mourning Dove by Emil Sher
Mouth by Robin Fulford
Mouthpiece by Norah Sadava and Amy Nostbakken
Mousetown by Hrant Alianak
Moving Out by Aviva Ravel
The Mumberley Inheritance by Warren Graves
Murder Game by W. E. Dan Ross
The Murderer in the Mirror by Peter Colley
Murmel, Murmel, Mortimer Munsch by Kim Selody
Mustard by Kat Sandler
My Darling Judith by Norm Foster
My Morocco by Ken Cameron
My Rumanian Cousin by Aviva Ravel
The Myth of Summer by Conni Massing
My Night With Tennessee by Sky Gilbert
My One and Only by Ken Cameron
My Own Private Oshawa by Jonathan Wilson
The Mystery of Maddy Heisler by Daniel R. Lillford

N

The Naciwonki Cap by Beth McMaster
Naked at the Opera by Tom Hendry
Naked on the Information Highway by Jaan Kolk
Naked on the North Shore: A Tale of Labrador by Ted Johns
Nancy Chew Enters the Dragon by Betty Quan
A Nanking Winter by Marjorie Chan
Naomi's Road by Paula Wing
Napi - The First Man by Rick McNair
A Native of the James Family by Betty Jane Wylie
Nativity by Peter Anderson
Neck-Breaking Car-Hop by Stewart Lemoine
Ned Durango Comes to Big Oak by Norm Foster
Nellie! How The Women Won The Vote by Diane Grant
Nellie Bly: Ten Days in a Madhouse by Beverley Cooper
Never Judge a Book by its Cover by Seymour Blicker
Never Swim Alone by Daniel MacIvor
New Canadian Kid by Dennis Foon
The New Canadian Curling Club by Mark Crawford
Newhouse by D.D. Kugler
The New Tereus by Robert Lalonde
Next Year's Man of Steel by David Belke
1949 by David French
Night by Hrant Alianak
Night Light by John Lazarus
The Night They Raided Truxxx by Paul Ledoux
The Nightingale by John Lazarus
A Nightingale Sang by Simon Johnston
The Noble Pursuit by Douglas Bowie
No Man's Land by Rahul Varma
No More by Rick McNair
No More Ketchup by Aviva Ravel
No More Medea by Deborah Porter Taylor
No Tell Motel by Michael G Wilmot
The Noose by Henry Beissel
The Norbals by Brian Drader
North by Greg Nelson
North Mountain Breakdown by Paul Ledoux
No Sweat by Anne Chislett
Nosy Parkers by Rose Scollard
Nothing Sacred by George F. Walker
Nothing to Lose by David Fennario
Not Quite the Same by Anne Chislett
Not so Dumb by John Lazarus
Not Spain by Richard Sanger
Not Wanted on the Voyage by Richard Rose and D.D. Kugler
No’ Xya’ by David Diamond
Nymphomaniac by Kico Gonzalez-Risso

O
Obaaberima by Tawiah M'carthy
Obedience by Robin Fulford
The Occupation of Heather Rose by Wendy Lill
O.D! by Janice Wiseman
The Odyssey by Christine Foster
The Odyssey by Maurice Breslow
The Odyssey by Rick Chafe
Of the Fields, Lately by David French
Offensive Fouls by Jason Long
Offensive Shadows by Paul Dunn
Office Hours by Norm Foster
Office Party by Jaan Kolk
The Oil Show: Legends of Petrolia by Ted Johns
Old Flames by Karen Wikberg
Old Love by Norm Foster
The Old Woman and the Pedlar by Betty Jane Wylie
Omniscience by Tim Carlson
Once Upon a Greek Stage by Beth McMaster
Once Upon a Time by Irene N. Watts
Once Upon a Time in Old Westmount by Richard Ouzounian
O'Neill by Daniel Libman
One Potato, Two Potato by Aviva Ravel
One Spring Morning by Cherie Thiessen
Only Birds and Fools Fly by Kim Selody
The Only Game in Town by Ed Schroeter
On the Job by David Fennario
On the Other Side of the Wall by Aviva Ravel
One Crack Out by David French
One Crowded Hour by Charlotte Fielden
One Night Stand by Carol Bolt
One Tiger to a Hill by Sharon Pollock.
One Man Star Wars Trilogy by Charles Ross
The Only Living Father by Thomas J. Cahill
Opening Night by Norm Foster
Operators by Margaret Hollingsworth
The Oprah Donahue Show by Mark Leiren-Young
Orchidelirium by Dave Carley
Organic Divide by Robin Fulford
Orpheus and Eurydice by Sam Scribble
Other Side of the Game by Amanda Parris
The Other Side of the Pole by Stephen Heatley
Oui by Andrew Moodie
Outlaw by Norm Foster
Out of Body by Beverley Cooper
Outside by Paul Dunn
Outside by Neil Fleming
Overlaid by Robertson Davies
Overtrick by Beth McMaster

See also
 List of Canadian playwrights
 Theatre of Canada
 Canadian Stage production history

External links
 Playwrights Guild of Canada list of 2,000 Canadian plays

References

Lists of plays

Canadian literature-related lists